A Graphics processing unit, or GPU, is a special stream processor used in computer graphics hardware.

GPU may also refer to

 Gambia Press Union
 General Public Utilities, a defunct American electric utility
 General Purpose Uniform, of the Royal Australian Air Force
 Global Peace and Unity, an annual Muslim conference
 Ground power unit, used to power aircraft on the ground
 State Political Directorate (Russian: , Gosudarstvennoye Politicheskoye Upravlenie), the secret police of the RSFSR and USSR from 1922 to 1923